Manuel d'Almeida Trindade (24 April 1918 – 5 August 2008) was a Portuguese Prelate of the Roman Catholic Church.

Trindade was born in Monsanto, Portugal and was ordained a priest on 21 December 1942. Trindade was appointed bishop of the Diocese of Aveiro, on 19 September 1962 and ordained bishop on 19 December 1962. Trindade retired from the Diocese of Aveiro on 20 January 1988.

Trindade died at the age of 90 on 5 August 2008.

See also
Diocese of Aveiro

External links
Catholic-Hierarchy
Aveiro Diocese 
Obituary notice

1918 births
2008 deaths
People from Idanha-a-Nova
Participants in the Second Vatican Council
20th-century Roman Catholic bishops in Portugal